Miller Pata  (born 11 June 1988) is a Vanuatuan beach volleyball player. She competed at the  2022 Commonwealth Games, in Beach volleyball winning a bronze medal.

She competed at the  2007 Oceania Championships, winning a silver medal, the 2018 Commonwealth Games, winning a bronze medal and the 2022 Commonwealth Games, winning a bronze medal.

References

External links
 

Living people
1988 births
Commonwealth Games bronze medallists for Vanuatu
Vanuatuan female beach volleyball players
Beach volleyball players at the 2018 Commonwealth Games
Beach volleyball players at the 2022 Commonwealth Games
Medallists at the 2022 Commonwealth Games